Petri Vehanen (born October 9, 1977, Rauma, Finland) is a retired Finnish professional ice hockey goaltender. During his career, he played for clubs in his native Finland, Italy, Norway, Sweden, Russia, Czech Republic and Germany. He won the World Championship with the Finnish national team in 2011.

Playing career

Liiga
Vehanen has played his entire SM-liiga career for Lukko which is his hometown team. Vehanen has established himself as the starting goaltender for Lukko and played a solid season in 2007-08 season, earning himself a spot at the Finnish National Team roster. In the 2009 Karjala Tournament he was selected as the best goaltender.

Vehanen also has played for Mestis teams Jääkotkat and FPS.

Europe
Vehanen has played in Europe for HC Neftekhimik Nizhnekamsk of Russia, Viking Hockey of Norway, where he was voted best goaltender, HC Val Pusterial Wolves in Italy and Mora IK in Sweden. Midway through the 2009-10 season, he joined the Kontinental Hockey League with Ak Bars Kazan, he made an immediate impact to help Kazan claim the Gagarin Cup, compiling the best Goals against average, save percentage and selected as the league's best goaltender.

After three seasons with Ak Bars, Vehanen returned to Lukko for a solitary season before again resuming his career in the KHL with HC Lev Praha. Vehanen took Praha to their maiden Gagarin Cup finals in the 2013-14 season, before the club disbanded.

On July 20, 2014, Vehanen opted to sign with German club, Eisbären Berlin of the Deutsche Eishockey Liga (DEL), on a one-year contract. He eventually stayed until the conclusion of the 2017–18 season. He announced his retirement in late April 2018 shortly after falling short in the DEL finals.

International Play

Vehanen played in his first International tournament in 2008, when he was selected to Finnish national team to play in 2008 Ice Hockey World Championships. Vehanen's World Championship debut came when he played against Norway which Finland won 3-2 after overtime. In 2011 Ice Hockey World Championships Finland won gold with Vehanen as a starting goaltender. In the final game Vehanen made 32 saves leading his team to a 6-1 win against Sweden.

Awards
 Deutsche Eishockey Liga (DEL) Runners-up in 2017–18
 KHL Runner-up in 2013-14
 Won the Gagarin Cup in 2009-10
 KHL best goalkeeper in 2009–10
 Karjala Tournament Best Goaltender in 2009
 Karjala Tournament All-Star team in 2009
 GET-ligaen All-Star team in 1998-99

References

External links

1977 births
Ak Bars Kazan players
Eisbären Berlin players
Finnish expatriate ice hockey players in Russia
HC Lev Praha players
Lukko players
Living people
Mora IK players
HC Neftekhimik Nizhnekamsk players
Viking Hockey players
Finnish ice hockey goaltenders
People from Rauma, Finland
Sportspeople from Satakunta
Finnish expatriate ice hockey players in Norway
Finnish expatriate ice hockey players in Italy
Finnish expatriate ice hockey players in Sweden
Finnish expatriate ice hockey players in Germany
Finnish expatriate ice hockey players in the Czech Republic